Neoregelia kautskyi is a species of flowering plant in the genus Neoregelia. This species is endemic to Brazil.

Cultivars
 Neoregelia 'Fireside Glow'
 Neoregelia 'Golden Chalice'
 Neoregelia 'Lucky Strike'
 Neoregelia 'Yellow Devil'

References

BSI Cultivar Registry Retrieved 11 October 2009

kautskyi
Flora of Brazil